Achievement Unlocked is a 2008 Adobe Flash video game developed in 4 days by John Cooney and published by Armor Games. While essentially a platform game, it has been referred to as a metagame as well as an "antigame". The game is a send-up of in-game achievements, still a relatively new concept at the release of the game. While a video game achievement is usually a meta-goal defined outside a game's parameters, in Achievement Unlocked, unlocking achievements is the only goal of the game. It's been described as a "commentary on the proliferation of nearly meaningless rewards in games" and was featured in the book 250 Indie Games You Must Play by Mike Rose and The Game Designer's Playlist: Innovative Games Every Game Designer Needs to Play by Zack Hiwiller.

References

Browser games
Flash games
Platform games
Art games
Single-player video games
Indie video games
Parody video games
Video games developed in the United States
Armor Games games